The Billboard Latin Music Award for Latin Rhythm Airplay Song of the Year is an honor that is presented annually at the Billboard Latin Music Awards, a ceremony which honors "the most popular albums, songs, and performers in Latin music, as determined by the actual sales, radio airplay, streaming and social data that informs Billboard's weekly charts."

The accolade for Latin Rhythm Airplay Song of the Year was first presented at the fifteenth Billboard Latin Music Awards in 2009 to Panamanian singer Flex's "Te Quiero". The song along with the parent album gained Flex thirteen nominations at the ceremony, where the song also received a nomination for Hot Latin Song of the Year, Hot Latin Song of the Year in the male category, Hot Latin Song of the Year in the new artist category, Latin Pop Song of the Year in the male category, Tropical Song of the Year in the male category and Latin RingMasters of the Year. It topped the Billboard Latin Rhythm Airplay chart for nine weeks in 2008. Puerto Rican singer Don Omar's "Danza Kuduro" was awarded twice, first in 2011 and again in 2012. Don Omar is also the artist with the most wins and nominations with three and seven, respectively. American entertainer Pitbull is the most nominated artist without a win, with three. Puerto Rico is the most awarded nationality, with seven wins. Winners have also been from Panama, Portugal, the Dominican Republic, Colombia and Spain.

Recipients

Records

Most nominations

Most awards

See also
Latin Grammy Award for Best Urban Song
Lo Nuestro Award for Urban Song of the Year

References

Rhythm Airplay Song of the Year
Awards established in 2009